Moore Hall, or Moorehall, the house and estate of George Henry Moore and family, is situated to the south of the village Carnacon in the barony of Carra, County Mayo in a karst limestone landscape. 

Named for the aristocratic Irish family who built the estate between 1792 and 1795, Moore Hall lies on Muckloon Hill overlooking Lough Carra. The house was designed by the Irish architect John Roberts. Several members of the Moore family played major parts in the social, cultural and political history of Ireland from the end of the eighteenth century to the early twentieth century. The house was burned down in 1923 by anti-Treaty IRA during the Irish Civil War as Maurice Moore was viewed as pro-Treaty.

Background
The Moores were an aristocratic Irish family who built Moore Hall between 1792 and 1795.  The first Moore of Moore Hall was George Moore, a name borne by many members of the family down the generations. The Moores were originally an English Protestant family but some became Catholic when John Moore married a Roman Catholic, Jane Lynch Athy of Galway, and when their son, George, married Katherine de Kilikelly (a.k.a. Kelly), an Irish-Spanish Catholic, in 1765.

Notable members of the Moore family, associated with Moore Hall, include:

 George Moore (1727–1799), who built Moore Hall, originally came from Straide near Castlebar. During the time of the Penal Laws, George went to Spain where he was admitted to the Royal Court. From the 1760s until about 1790, George Moore made his fortune in the wine and brandy trade, running his business from Alicante.
 George's son, John Moore (1767–1799), was educated in France and became a lawyer.  With the rebellion of 1798, he returned to Mayo.  General Humbert appointed him President of the Connacht Republic in Castlebar. Thus, John Moore was the first President of an Irish republic, albeit for a very brief interval. He was captured and, although initially sentenced to death, his sentence was later commuted to deportation.  He died in the Royal Oak tavern in Waterford on 6 December 1799.
 George Henry Moore (1810–1870), was educated in the Catholic faith in England and later at Cambridge University.  His main interest was in horses. At the height of the Great Irish Famine in 1846, he entered a horse called Coranna for the Chester Gold Cup and netted £17,000 from bets laid on the horse. He used his winnings to import thousands of tons of grain and cattle to aid his tenants. It is still remembered on the Moore estate that nobody was evicted from their home for non-payment of rent during hard times, and that there were no deaths there during the Famine.  George Henry is buried in the family vault at Kiltoom on the Moore Hall estate.
 George Augustus Moore (1852–1933), was a writer during the Irish Literary Revival period.  A number of notable writers of the time, including Lady Gregory, Maria Edgeworth, and W. B. Yeats were regular visitors to Moore Hall. George Augustus Moore was an agnostic and anti-Catholic. His ashes are buried on Castle Island on Lough Carra in view of the big house on the hill.
 Maurice George Moore (1854–1939), Senator Colonel Maurice Moore was the statesman of the family.  He served with the Connaught Rangers in the Boer War and became concerned with human rights in South Africa. He was also involved with the co-operative movement in Ireland, founded by Horace Plunkett.

History
The house at Moore Hall was designed by John Roberts, an architect from Waterford who also designed Tyrone House in County Galway in a similar style. It was built between 1792 and 1796, and was occupied by various members of the extended Moore family until the turn of the 20th century.

Moore Hall house was burned down on 1 February 1923 during the Irish Civil War. An account of the burning was given shortly afterwards by the owner in a letter to the press.

Later ownership

The house, lake, farm, and estate is now owned by the forestry company, Coillte, and it is a visitor attraction in the area. The house is not open to the public due to its poor condition – it has not been refurbished since it was burned. Non-native forestry grows on the estate lands along with areas of natural regeneration of clearfell areas recently cut by Coillte. Trees have begun growing over the farm walls and buildings behind the ruins of the grand house. Local people who lived and worked on the Moore Hall estate remembered it fondly. The estate passed to the Irish Land Commission upon the death of George Moore, and a campaign to restore the house has been waged. 

In 2018 the Mayo County Council purchased the 80-acre site with the intent of turning it into a tourist destination. The project is being undertaken as a strategic partnership between the Mayo Council, Coillte, and the National Parks and Wildlife Service. The first phase of work is to include restoration of the Walled Garden, as well as new visitor facilities including walkways, seating, play areas and signage. Storyboards telling the story of Moore Hall, the Moore Family and their role in the history of the Irish nation are also planned for the site.

Gallery

References

External links
 Moore family record at the Landed Estates Database, NUI Galway.
 Estate record at the Landed Estates Database, NUI Galway.

Buildings and structures in County Mayo
Houses in the Republic of Ireland